Gustaf Edvard Törnros (18 March 1887 – 2 April 1941) was a Swedish long-distance runner. He competed in the marathon at the 1906, 1908 and 1912 Summer Olympics with the best result of fourth place in 1906. Half of the participants, including Törnros, failed to finish the 1912 marathon due to the hot weather with temperatures exceeding 30 °C. Törnros won the national marathon title in 1911 and 1912.

References

External links
 

1887 births
1941 deaths
Athletes (track and field) at the 1906 Intercalated Games
Athletes (track and field) at the 1908 Summer Olympics
Athletes (track and field) at the 1912 Summer Olympics
Swedish male long-distance runners
Swedish male marathon runners
Olympic athletes of Sweden
Sportspeople from Södermanland County